Clwb Pêl Droed Llanfair­pwllgwyngyll­gogery­chwyrn­drobwll­llan­tysilio­gogo­goch Football Club, commonly referred to by a shortened version as CPD Llanfairpwll FC, is a football team based in Llanfair­pwllgwyngyll­gogery­chwyrn­drobwll­llan­tysilio­gogo­goch, that plays in the North Wales Coast West Football League, the 5th level of the Welsh football league system, since the 2020–21 season.

Club history
Formed in 1899 as Llanfair Rovers, they entered the North Wales Coast League and had a good season, playing 23 matches; winning 10, drawing 5 and losing 8.

They have been champions of the Welsh Alliance League in the 1987–88 season and the 2000–01 season. They have been runners-up three times. They also played Football League opposition in the Welsh Cup in the form of Shrewsbury Town in 1987, losing 1–0 at Caernarfon Town.

The name of the football club is also known to be the longest football club name in the world. However, Inverness Caledonian Thistle F.C. holds the record when it comes to professional football.

New ground
The club had played at Y Gors ('The Gors') – close to the railway station – since their inception, but moved in season 2008–09 to a new ground 400 metres north west at Maes Eilian with better facilities and drainage. This was followed by a poor run in which at one point the club were in danger of relegation from the Cymru Alliance (the joint second tier of the Welsh pyramid), however a good string of results pulled them clear of danger to finish 10th. The club were demoted to the Welsh Alliance 1st division at the end of 2009–10 season following an overhaul of the league structure by the FAW. A subsequent relegation at the end of 2011–12 saw the club drop into Welsh Alliance Division 2.

The name of the new ground, Maes Eilian, translates as Eilian's Field, in reference to a local legend of a saint who performed last-minute miracles.

Honours
Welsh Alliance League
Champions (2): 1987–88, 2000–01
Runners-up (4): 1986–87, 1992–93, 1993–94, 1996–97
Division Two – Runners-up (1): 2012–13
Gwynedd League:
Runners-up: 1983–84
Anglesey League:
Champions (6): 1953–54, 1974–75, 1975–76, 1976–77, 1981–82, 1982–83
North Wales Coast FA Junior Challenge Cup – Winners: 1975–76, 1980–81, 1982–83, 2015–16 (reserves)

References

External links 
 Club website
 Facebook
 Twitter

Football clubs in Wales
Association football clubs established in 1899
1899 establishments in Wales
Llanfairpwllgwyngyll
Cymru Alliance clubs
North Wales Coast Football League clubs
Welsh Alliance League clubs
Anglesey League clubs
Gwynedd League clubs
North Wales Coast League clubs